Griotte is a cultural and old trade name given to a type of marbles and limestones. The natural stone is deep cherry-red in colour (Griotte is a French word meaning a Morello cherry), often flecked with small dashes of purple and/or spots and streaks of white formed by Goniatites or by later cementation. It is common in the south of France, in the Pyrenees and southern Belgium. It is sometimes known as Cannes Marble.

See also
List of types of marble
Geology of the Pyrenees

External links
 Eric Groessens: Les matériaux de construction de Belgique et du Nord de la France

Marble
Limestone